The 2014–15 season is a season played by Anderlecht, a Belgian football club based in Anderlecht, Brussels. The season covers the period from 1 July 2014 to 30 June 2015. Anderlecht will be participating in the Belgian Pro League, Belgian Cup, Belgian Super Cup and the UEFA Champions League.

Review

Background

Pre-season
It was announced that Anderlecht would play six matches in preparation for the 2014-15 season, with games against Royal Knokke, Oudenaarde, Mons, Dynamo Kyiv, RFC Liège and Deinze with the pre-season matches starting from 28 June 2014 and ending on 22 July 2014.

Anderlecht kicked off their pre-season campaign with a 1-4 victory away to Royal Knokke on 28 June at Stadion Olivier. The club followed that with a 0-2 win at Oudenaarde, with goals coming from Youri Tielemans and Frank Acheampong. Anderlecht then drew 0-0 with Mons in match remembered less so for the result but more so for the return of Matías Suárez who had been out injured since October 2013 due to a serious knee injury he suffered in training at that time. On 11 July, Anderlecht faced Dynamo Kyiv in Austria. A match they won 2-1 thanks to a brace from Frank Acheampong.

On the following Wednesday, Anderlecht won their penultimate pre-season fixture when they beat RFC Liège 0-2 at the Stade du Pairay, with goals coming from Aleksandar Mitrović and Samuel Armenteros. Anderlecht won their sixth and final friendly match on July 22, beating Deinze 0-1 at the Burgemeester Van de Wiele Stadion thanks to a goal from Nathan Kabasele. Which meant the club ended pre-season unbeaten, winning five and drawing just one.

Transfers
Anderlecht's first summer signing was Brazilian Wigor Alan do Nascimento who was signed from Brazilian club Capivariano after a successful trial. The club also signed goalkeeper Mulopo Kudimbana on a permanent contract in June, with the Congolese international joining from Oostende. Samuel Armenteros, Michaël Heylen, Mehdi Tarfi and Fede Vico all returned from their loan spells at Feyenoord, Kortrijk, Zulte Waregem and Oostende respectively while Demy de Zeeuw left in the opposite direction following the completion of his loan spell from Spartak Moscow.

Numerous outgoings were completed also. Fernando Canesin completed a permanent transfer to Oostende, Nabil Jaadi left the club to join Italian Serie A side Udinese while Jordan Lukaku joined Oostende permanently after a successful loan spell. Four other players also completed permanent moves away from the club, Massimo Bruno to Red Bull Salzburg, Cheikhou Kouyaté to West Ham United, David Pollet to Gent and Dalibor Veselinović to Mechelen. Elis Koulibaly and Youri Lapage were loaned to Eendracht Aalst, the Belgian Second Division side also claimed to have signed Jonathan Kindermans on loan but Anderlecht later confirmed Kindermans was to join Eerste Divisie side Telstar on loan.

Guillaume Gillet also left the club on loan, he joined French Ligue 1 side Bastia on a season-long loan deal on 10 July.

July
On 20 July, Anderlecht played their first competitive fixture of the season in the 2014 Belgian Super Cup against Lokeren, a match they won 2-1 at their home ground of Constant Vanden Stock Stadium. Aleksandar Mitrović gave Anderlecht the early lead on twenty-nine minutes after a byline pass from Cyriac. Lokeren equalised on seventy-three minutes thanks to a looping header from Tunisian striker Hamdi Harbaoui. As the match was heading for extra time Anderlecht found a ninety first-minute winner, Andy Najar put in a cross which was met by Lokeren's Denis Odoi who put the ball into his own net for an own goal. That won Anderlecht their twelfth Belgian Super Cup triumph.

Match details
League positions are sourced by Statto, while the remaining information is referenced individually.

Belgian Pro League

Regular season

League table

Matches

Championship playoff

Playoff table

Matches

Belgian Super Cup

Belgian Cup

UEFA Champions League

UEFA Europa League

Appearances and goals
Source:
Numbers in parentheses denote appearances as substitute.
Players with names struck through and marked  left the club during the playing season.
Players with names in italics and marked * were on loan from another club for the whole of their season with Anderlecht.
Players listed with no appearances have been in the matchday squad but only as unused substitutes.
Key to positions: GK – Goalkeeper; DF – Defender; MF – Midfielder; FW – Forward

Club

Coaching staff

Other information

Transfers

Transfers in

Loans in

Total spending:   Undisclosed

Transfers out

Loans out

Total income:  Undisclosed

References

Anderlecht
R.S.C. Anderlecht seasons
Anderlecht